is a Japanese film director and screenwriter.

Career
Born in Osaka Prefecture, Toyoda was first a prodigy in the game of shogi or Japanese chess. He attended the Japan Shogi Association's apprenticeship (Shōreikai) from age 9 with the aim of becoming a professional player. But his interest turned to film and he quit when he was 17. Moving to Tokyo at age 21, he began working with producer Genjirō Arato and director Junji Sakamoto, assisting the latter on the shogi-related film Ōte, for which he helped pen the script. He debuted as a director with the film Pornostar in 1999, a film that earned him the Directors Guild of Japan New Directors Award. His career continued to rise through films like Blue Spring and 9 Souls, but he suffered a setback when he was arrested on drug charges just before Hanging Garden was released in 2005. He resumed directing with the 2009 film The Blood of Rebirth.

Selected filmography
Oute (王手, Oute) (1991) Screenplay
Biliken (ビリケン, Biriken) (1996) Screenplay
Pornostar (ポルノスター, Porunosutā) (1999)
Blue Spring (青い春, Aoi haru) (2001)
9 Souls (ナイン・ソウルズ, Nainu sōruzu) (2003)
Hanging Garden  (空中庭園, Kūchū teien) (2005)
The Blood of Rebirth (蘇りの血, Yomigaeri no chi 2009)
Monsters Club (モンスターズクラブ, Monsutāzu kurabu) (2012)
I'm Flash! (アイム・フラッシュ！, Aimu Furasshu) (2012)
Crows Explode (2014)
The Miracle of Crybaby Shottan (2018)
Noroshi ga Yobu (2019)
Hakai no Hi (2020)
Go Seppuku Yourselves (2021)
Transcending Dimensions (2024)

Music videos
"Kimi to Iu Hana" (Asian Kung-Fu Generation)
"Siren" (Asian Kung-Fu Generation)
"Ato 10 Byō de"(Art-School)
"Lost in the Air" (Art-School)
"Hakkō" (Rosso)
"Sangatsu" (Does)

References

External links

Japanese film directors
1969 births
Living people
Japanese screenwriters
People from Osaka
Japanese shogi players